Vadim Gamletovich Gagloev (born 18 January 1989) is a former Russian professional footballer.

Career
Gagloev made his professional debut for CSKA Moscow on 20 September 2006 in the Russian Cup game against Mordovia.

International career
Gagloev was the captain of the Russian U-17 squad that won the 2006 UEFA U-17 Championship.

References

External links
 
 

1989 births
People from Tskhinvali
Living people
Russian footballers
Association football midfielders
Russia youth international footballers
PFC CSKA Moscow players
FC Spartak Vladikavkaz players
FC Amkar Perm players
Ossetian people
FC Tyumen players
FC Nizhny Novgorod (2007) players
FC Mordovia Saransk players
FC Yenisey Krasnoyarsk players
Russian Premier League players